Lisa Marie Franchetti (born 25 April 1964) is a United States Navy admiral who serves as the 42nd vice chief of naval operations since 2 September 2022.

A surface warfare officer, Franchetti previously served as director for strategy, plans, and policy of the Joint Staff from 2020 to 2022, the second deputy chief of naval operations for warfighting development in 2020, and commander of the United States Sixth Fleet from 2018 to 2020. She is the second woman to be promoted to four-star admiral in the United States Navy.

Early life
Franchetti was born in 1964 in Rochester, New York. She studied at the Northwestern University’s Medill School of Journalism in Evanston, Illinois, being awarded a Bachelor of Science degree in journalism and earning departmental honors in history. While at Northwestern, she joined the Naval Reserve Officer Training Corps Program and was commissioned in 1985.

Further education
Franchetti has attended the Naval War College in Newport, Rhode Island, and holds a master's degree in organizational management from the University of Phoenix.

Navy career

Franchetti's shoreside career has included: commander, United States Naval Reserve Center Central Point, Oregon; aide to the Vice Chief of Naval Operations; protocol officer for the Commander, United States Atlantic Fleet; 4th Battalion officer at the United States Naval Academy; division chief, Joint Concept Development and Experimentation, on the Joint Staff, J7; deputy director of International Engagement and executive assistant to N3/N5 on the Navy staff; and military assistant to the Secretary of the Navy.

Since promotion to flag rank, Franchetti has held appointments as: commander, United States Naval Forces Korea; commander Carrier Strike Group 9; commander, Carrier Strike Group 15; and chief of staff, Joint Staff, J-5, Strategy, Plans and Policy; and Commander, United States Sixth Fleet, Naval Striking and Support Forces NATO; deputy commander, United States Naval Forces Europe; deputy commander United States Naval Forces Africa; and Joint Force Maritime Component Commander.

On 6 May 2020, Franchetti was nominated chief of naval operations for Warfighting development (OPNAV N7), while keeping her other roles.

In April 2022, Franchetti was nominated for promotion to admiral and appointment as vice chief of naval operations. The Senate confirmed her promotion in May 2022. She assumed the position on 2 September 2022.

According to USNI News, Franchetti is a top contender to replace Michael M. Gilday as chief of naval operations in 2023.

Personal
Franchetti is married and has a child.

Awards and decorations

See also
 Women in the United States Navy

References

This article incorporates public domain material from the United States Navy document "US Navy Biography: Vice Admiral Lisa M. Franchetti" (2018-03-07). Retrieved 2018-10-08.

Living people
Northwestern University alumni
Naval War College alumni
University of Phoenix alumni
Female admirals of the United States Navy
United States Navy admirals
Vice Chiefs of Naval Operations
Recipients of the Defense Distinguished Service Medal
Recipients of the Navy Distinguished Service Medal
Recipients of the Legion of Merit
People from Rochester, New York
1964 births
21st-century American women